Joseph Patrick Lydon (February 2, 1878 – August 19, 1937) was an American welterweight boxer who competed in the early twentieth century. He was born in Swinford, County Mayo, Ireland. He competed at the 1904 Summer Olympics, tying for a bronze medal in the welterweight division with fellow American boxer Jack Egan.

He also competed at the soccer tournament in the 1904 Olympics and his team Christian Brothers College took silver medals.

References

External links
profile

1878 births
1937 deaths
Welterweight boxers
American soccer players
Association football forwards
Olympic soccer players of the United States
Boxers at the 1904 Summer Olympics
Footballers at the 1904 Summer Olympics
Olympic silver medalists for the United States in boxing
Olympic bronze medalists for the United States in boxing
Irish male boxers
Association footballers from County Mayo
Irish association footballers (before 1923)
Irish emigrants to the United States (before 1923)
Olympic medalists in football
American male boxers
Medalists at the 1904 Summer Olympics
Christian Brothers Cadets men's soccer players
People from Swinford, County Mayo